Zhukovo is the name of several rural localities in Russia.

Modern localities

Arkhangelsk Oblast
As of 2012, one rural locality in Arkhangelsk Oblast bears this name:
Zhukovo, Arkhangelsk Oblast, a village in Irtovsky Selsoviet of Lensky District

Republic of Bashkortostan
As of 2012, one rural locality in the Republic of Bashkortostan bears this name:
Zhukovo, Republic of Bashkortostan, a selo in Zhukovsky Selsoviet of Ufimsky District

Belgorod Oblast
As of 2012, one rural locality in Belgorod Oblast bears this name:
Zhukovo, Belgorod Oblast, a selo in Alexeyevsky District

Bryansk Oblast
As of 2012, three rural localities in Bryansk Oblast bear this name:
Zhukovo, Dubrovsky District, Bryansk Oblast, a village in Aleshinsky Rural Administrative Okrug of Dubrovsky District; 
Zhukovo, Rognedinsky District, Bryansk Oblast, a village in Voronovsky Rural Administrative Okrug of Rognedinsky District; 
Zhukovo, Unechsky District, Bryansk Oblast, a village in Ivaytensky Rural Administrative Okrug of Unechsky District;

Chelyabinsk Oblast
As of 2012, one rural locality in Chelyabinsk Oblast bears this name:
Zhukovo, Chelyabinsk Oblast, a village in Bagaryaksky Selsoviet of Kaslinsky District

Ivanovo Oblast
As of 2012, four rural localities in Ivanovo Oblast bear this name:
Zhukovo, Furmanovsky District, Ivanovo Oblast, a village in Furmanovsky District
Zhukovo, Ivanovsky District, Ivanovo Oblast, a village in Ivanovsky District
Zhukovo, Palekhsky District, Ivanovo Oblast, a village in Palekhsky District
Zhukovo, Puchezhsky District, Ivanovo Oblast, a village in Puchezhsky District

Kaluga Oblast
As of 2012, two rural localities in Kaluga Oblast bear this name:
Zhukovo, Ulyanovsky District, Kaluga Oblast, a village in Ulyanovsky District
Zhukovo, Zhukovsky District, Kaluga Oblast, a village in Zhukovsky District

Kirov Oblast
As of 2012, one rural locality in Kirov Oblast bears this name:
Zhukovo, Kirov Oblast, a village in Utmanovsky Rural Okrug of Podosinovsky District;

Kostroma Oblast
As of 2012, three rural localities in Kostroma Oblast bear this name:
Zhukovo, Galichsky District, Kostroma Oblast, a village in Orekhovskoye Settlement of Galichsky District; 
Zhukovo, Kadyysky District, Kostroma Oblast, a village in Selishchenskoye Settlement of Kadyysky District; 
Zhukovo, Susaninsky District, Kostroma Oblast, a village in Severnoye Settlement of Susaninsky District;

Kurgan Oblast
As of 2012, one rural locality in Kurgan Oblast bears this name:
Zhukovo, Kurgan Oblast, a selo in Zhukovsky Selsoviet of Kurtamyshsky District;

Kursk Oblast
As of 2012, one rural locality in Kursk Oblast bears this name:
Zhukovo, Kursk Oblast, a village in Nizhensky Selsoviet of Cheremisinovsky District

Lipetsk Oblast
As of 2012, two rural localities in Lipetsk Oblast bear this name:
Zhukovo, Dankovsky District, Lipetsk Oblast, a village in Speshnevo-Ivanovsky Selsoviet of Dankovsky District; 
Zhukovo, Krasninsky District, Lipetsk Oblast, a village in Krasninsky Selsoviet of Krasninsky District;

Republic of Mordovia
As of 2012, one rural locality in the Republic of Mordovia bears this name:
Zhukovo, Republic of Mordovia, a selo in Zhukovsky Selsoviet of Torbeyevsky District;

Moscow Oblast
As of 2012, seven rural localities in Moscow Oblast bear this name:
Zhukovo, Domodedovo, Moscow Oblast, a village under the administrative jurisdiction of Domodedovo Town Under Oblast Jurisdiction; 
Zhukovo, Dmitrovsky District, Moscow Oblast, a village under the administrative jurisdiction of the Town of Yakhroma in Dmitrovsky District; 
Zhukovo, Klinsky District, Moscow Oblast, a village under the administrative jurisdiction of the Town of Klin in Klinsky District; 
Zhukovo, Ramensky District, Moscow Oblast, a village in Chulkovskoye Rural Settlement of Ramensky District; 
Zhukovo, Peshkovskoye Rural Settlement, Solnechnogorsky District, Moscow Oblast, a settlement in Peshkovskoye Rural Settlement of Solnechnogorsky District; 
Zhukovo, Sokolovskoye Rural Settlement, Solnechnogorsky District, Moscow Oblast, a village in Sokolovskoye Rural Settlement of Solnechnogorsky District; 
Zhukovo, Taldomsky District, Moscow Oblast, a village in Tempovoye Rural Settlement of Taldomsky District;

Nizhny Novgorod Oblast
As of 2012, three rural localities in Nizhny Novgorod Oblast bear this name:
Zhukovo, Chkalovsky District, Nizhny Novgorod Oblast, a village in Kotelnitsky Selsoviet of Chkalovsky District
Zhukovo, Krasnobakovsky District, Nizhny Novgorod Oblast, a village in Zubilikhinsky Selsoviet of Krasnobakovsky District; 
Zhukovo, Sokolsky District, Nizhny Novgorod Oblast, a village in Volzhsky Selsoviet of Sokolsky District;

Novgorod Oblast
As of 2012, three rural localities in Novgorod Oblast bear this name:
Zhukovo, Borovichsky District, Novgorod Oblast, a village in Konchansko-Suvorovskoye Settlement of Borovichsky District
Zhukovo, Moshenskoy District, Novgorod Oblast, a village in Kalininskoye Settlement of Moshenskoy District
Zhukovo, Starorussky District, Novgorod Oblast, a village in Novoselskoye Settlement of Starorussky District

Orenburg Oblast
As of 2012, one rural locality in Orenburg Oblast bears this name:
Zhukovo, Orenburg Oblast, a village in Pilyuginsky Selsoviet of Buguruslansky District

Penza Oblast
As of 2012, one rural locality in Penza Oblast bears this name:
Zhukovo, Penza Oblast, a village in Volynshchinsky Selsoviet of Bekovsky District

Perm Krai
As of 2012, one rural locality in Perm Krai bears this name:
Zhukovo, Perm Krai, a village in Yusvinsky District

Pskov Oblast
As of 2012, eighteen rural localities in Pskov Oblast bear this name:
Zhukovo, Gdovsky District, Pskov Oblast, a village in Gdovsky District
Zhukovo, Kunyinsky District, Pskov Oblast, a village in Kunyinsky District
Zhukovo, Loknyansky District, Pskov Oblast, a village in Loknyansky District
Zhukovo (Ust-Dolysskaya Rural Settlement), Nevelsky District, Pskov Oblast, a village in Nevelsky District; municipally, a part of Ust-Dolysskaya Rural Settlement of that district
Zhukovo (Artemovskaya Rural Settlement), Nevelsky District, Pskov Oblast, a village in Nevelsky District; municipally, a part of Artemovskaya Rural Settlement of that district
Zhukovo (Zhadritskaya Rural Settlement), Novorzhevsky District, Pskov Oblast, a village in Novorzhevsky District; municipally, a part of Zhadritskaya Rural Settlement of that district
Zhukovo (Vyborskaya Rural Settlement), Novorzhevsky District, Pskov Oblast, a village in Novorzhevsky District; municipally, a part of Vyborskaya Rural Settlement of that district
Zhukovo (Veskinskaya Rural Settlement), Novorzhevsky District, Pskov Oblast, a village in Novorzhevsky District; municipally, a part of Veskinskaya Rural Settlement of that district
Zhukovo (Stekhnovskaya Rural Settlement), Novorzhevsky District, Pskov Oblast, a village in Novorzhevsky District; municipally, a part of Stekhnovskaya Rural Settlement of that district
Zhukovo (Runovskaya Rural Settlement), Novosokolnichesky District, Pskov Oblast, a village in Novosokolnichesky District; municipally, a part of Runovskaya Rural Settlement of that district
Zhukovo (Mayevskaya Rural Settlement), Novosokolnichesky District, Pskov Oblast, a village in Novosokolnichesky District; municipally, a part of Mayevskaya Rural Settlement of that district
Zhukovo, Opochetsky District, Pskov Oblast, a village in Opochetsky District
Zhukovo, Ostrovsky District, Pskov Oblast, a village in Ostrovsky District
Zhukovo (Palkinskaya Rural Settlement), Palkinsky District, Pskov Oblast, a village in Palkinsky District; municipally, a part of Palkinskaya Rural Settlement of that district
Zhukovo (Novousitovskaya Rural Settlement), Palkinsky District, Pskov Oblast, a village in Palkinsky District; municipally, a part of Novousitovskaya Rural Settlement of that district
Zhukovo (Kachanovskaya Rural Settlement), Palkinsky District, Pskov Oblast, a village in Palkinsky District; municipally, a part of Kachanovskaya Rural Settlement of that district
Zhukovo, Pskovsky District, Pskov Oblast, a village in Pskovsky District
Zhukovo, Pushkinogorsky District, Pskov Oblast, a village in Pushkinogorsky District

Ryazan Oblast
As of 2012, two rural localities in Ryazan Oblast bear this name:
Zhukovo, Kasimovsky District, Ryazan Oblast, a village in Ardabyevsky Rural Okrug of Kasimovsky District
Zhukovo, Ryazansky District, Ryazan Oblast, a village in Podvyazyevsky Rural Okrug of Ryazansky District

Smolensk Oblast
As of 2012, seven rural localities in Smolensk Oblast bear this name:
Zhukovo, Demidovsky District, Smolensk Oblast, a village in Borkovskoye Rural Settlement of Demidovsky District
Zhukovo, Dukhovshchinsky District, Smolensk Oblast, a village in Bulgakovskoye Rural Settlement of Dukhovshchinsky District
Zhukovo, Gogolevskoye Rural Settlement, Monastyrshchinsky District, Smolensk Oblast, a village in Gogolevskoye Rural Settlement of Monastyrshchinsky District
Zhukovo, Tatarskoye Rural Settlement, Monastyrshchinsky District, Smolensk Oblast, a village in Tatarskoye Rural Settlement of Monastyrshchinsky District
Zhukovo, Safonovsky District, Smolensk Oblast, a village in Bogdanovshchinskoye Rural Settlement of Safonovsky District
Zhukovo, Smolensky District, Smolensk Oblast, a village in Stabenskoye Rural Settlement of Smolensky District
Zhukovo, Yartsevsky District, Smolensk Oblast, a village in Miropolskoye Rural Settlement of Yartsevsky District

Sverdlovsk Oblast
As of 2012, one rural locality in Sverdlovsk Oblast bears this name:
Zhukovo, Sverdlovsk Oblast, a village in Aramashkovsky Selsoviet of Rezhevsky District

Republic of Tatarstan
As of 2012, one rural locality in the Republic of Tatarstan bears this name:
Zhukovo, Republic of Tatarstan, a village in Tetyushsky District

Tomsk Oblast
As of 2012, one rural locality in Tomsk Oblast bears this name:
Zhukovo, Tomsk Oblast, a selo in Krivosheinsky District

Tula Oblast
As of 2012, three rural localities in Tula Oblast bear this name:
Zhukovo, Aleksinsky District, Tula Oblast, a village in Solopensky Rural Okrug of Aleksinsky District
Zhukovo, Belyovsky District, Tula Oblast, a selo in Zhukovsky Rural Okrug of Belyovsky District
Zhukovo, Venyovsky District, Tula Oblast, a village in Belkovsky Rural Okrug of Venyovsky District

Tver Oblast
As of 2012, eleven rural localities in Tver Oblast bear this name:
Zhukovo, Andreapolsky District, Tver Oblast, a village in Toropatskoye Rural Settlement of Andreapolsky District
Zhukovo, Bologovsky District, Tver Oblast, a village in Kaftinskoye Rural Settlement of Bologovsky District
Zhukovo, Firovsky District, Tver Oblast, a village in Velikooktyabrskoye Rural Settlement of Firovsky District
Zhukovo, Kashinsky District, Tver Oblast, a village in Farafonovskoye Rural Settlement of Kashinsky District
Zhukovo, Kesovogorsky District, Tver Oblast, a village in Nikolskoye Rural Settlement of Kesovogorsky District
Zhukovo, Oleninsky District, Tver Oblast, a village in Glazkovskoye Rural Settlement of Oleninsky District
Zhukovo, Ostashkovsky District, Tver Oblast, a village in Khitinskoye Rural Settlement of Ostashkovsky District
Zhukovo, Rzhevsky District, Tver Oblast, a village in Khoroshevo Rural Settlement of Rzhevsky District
Zhukovo, Vesyegonsky District, Tver Oblast, a village in Lyubegoshchinskoye Rural Settlement of Vesyegonsky District
Zhukovo, Vyshnevolotsky District, Tver Oblast, a settlement in Yesenovichskoye Rural Settlement of Vyshnevolotsky District
Zhukovo, Zubtsovsky District, Tver Oblast, a village in Knyazhyegorskoye Rural Settlement of Zubtsovsky District

Vologda Oblast
As of 2012, six rural localities in Vologda Oblast bear this name:
Zhukovo, Kichmengsko-Gorodetsky District, Vologda Oblast, a village in Pyzhugsky Selsoviet of Kichmengsko-Gorodetsky District
Zhukovo, Ust-Kubinsky District, Vologda Oblast, a village in Nikolsky Selsoviet of Ust-Kubinsky District
Zhukovo, Ustyuzhensky District, Vologda Oblast, a village in Soshnevsky Selsoviet of Ustyuzhensky District
Zhukovo, Velikoustyugsky District, Vologda Oblast, a village in Verkhneshardengsky Selsoviet of Velikoustyugsky District
Zhukovo, Bereznikovsky Selsoviet, Vologodsky District, Vologda Oblast, a village in Bereznikovsky Selsoviet of Vologodsky District
Zhukovo, Staroselsky Selsoviet, Vologodsky District, Vologda Oblast, a village in Staroselsky Selsoviet of Vologodsky District

Yaroslavl Oblast
As of 2012, four rural localities in Yaroslavl Oblast bear this name:
Zhukovo, Myshkinsky District, Yaroslavl Oblast, a village in Rozhdestvensky Rural Okrug of Myshkinsky District
Zhukovo, Nekouzsky District, Yaroslavl Oblast, a village in Nekouzsky Rural Okrug of Nekouzsky District
Zhukovo, Bekrenevsky Rural Okrug, Yaroslavsky District, Yaroslavl Oblast, a village in Bekrenevsky Rural Okrug of Yaroslavsky District
Zhukovo, Pestretsovsky Rural Okrug, Yaroslavsky District, Yaroslavl Oblast, a village in Pestretsovsky Rural Okrug of Yaroslavsky District

Alternative names
Zhukovo, alternative name of Zhukovka, a village in Tsarevskoye Rural Settlement of Pushkinsky District in Moscow Oblast; 
Zhukovo, alternative name of Zhukova, a village in Stanovskoy Selsoviet of Orlovsky District in Oryol Oblast; 
Zhukovo, alternative name of Zhukovskoye, a selo in Zhukovskoye Rural Settlement of Peschanokopsky District in Rostov Oblast; 
Zhukovo, alternative name of Zhukov, a khutor in Zadono-Kagalnitskoye Rural Settlement of Semikarakorsky District in Rostov Oblast;

See also
Zhukov (disambiguation)
Zhukovsky (disambiguation)
Zhukovka